Torraccia is a small village (curazia) located in San Marino. It belongs to the municipality (castello) of Domagnano.

Geography

Torraccia is situated in the east of Domagnano, close to the borders with the Italian municipality of Coriano, in the Province of Rimini. It is principally crossed by two roads named Strada di Montelupo and Strada di Monte Olivo. This one links the village to Domagnano, Fiorina and Serravalle.

In the south of the village, in the locality of Montelupo, it is located the Torraccia airfield coordinates), the only airfield in San Marino. It is owned by the AeroClub San Marino (ACS).

See also
Domagnano
Cà Giannino
Fiorina
Piandivello
Spaccio Giannoni

References

Curazie in San Marino
Italy–San Marino border crossings
Domagnano